White Cloud Airport  is a public airport owned and operated by the City of White Cloud located 1m (1.6 km) north of White Cloud, a city in Newaygo County, Michigan, United States. The airport is uncontrolled, and is used for general aviation purposes.

The airport has one runway, designated as runway 18/36 and paved with asphalt. It measures 2916 x 60 ft (889 x 18 m).

There is a fixed-base operator at the airport that sells fuel.

For the 12-month period ending December 31, 2020, the airport had 996 aircraft operations, an average of 83 per month. It was composed entirely of general aviation. For the same time period, 11 aircraft were based on the field, all airplanes: 10 single-engine and 1 multi-engine.

Accidents and incidents 

 On July 15, 2004, a Mooney M20 sustained substantial damage on impact with terrain during a forced landing at the White Cloud Airport. The probable cause was found to be a loss of engine power during cruise flight due to the mechanic's improper maintenance, the disconnected oil line, the oil leak from the disconnected line, and the unsuitable terrain the pilot encountered during the forced landing.

References

External links
White Cloud Airport

Airports in Michigan
Buildings and structures in Newaygo County, Michigan
Transportation in Newaygo County, Michigan